Alexandra Konstantinovna Kosteniuk (born 23 April 1984) is a Swiss chess grandmaster who is the former Women's World Rapid Chess Champion in 2021, and the former Women's World Chess Champion from 2008 to 2010. She was European women's champion in 2004 and a two-time Russian Women's Chess Champion (in 2005 and 2016). Kosteniuk won the team gold medal playing for Russia at the Women's Chess Olympiads of 2010, 2012 and 2014; the Women's World Team Chess Championship of 2017; and the Women's European Team Chess Championships of 2007, 2009, 2011, 2015 and 2017; and the Women's Chess World Cup 2021. In 2022, due to the Russian invasion of Ukraine, she switched to FIDE, and as of March 2023 she represents Switzerland.

Chess career
Kosteniuk learned to play chess at the age of five after being taught by her father. She graduated in 2003 from the Russian State Academy of Physical Education in Moscow as a certified professional chess trainer.

1994
Alexandra won the girls under 10 division of the European Youth Chess Championship.

1996
Alexandra won the girls under 12 title at both the European Youth Championships and World Youth Chess Championships. At twelve years old she also became the Russian women's champion in rapid chess.

2001

In 2001, at the age of 17, she reached the final of the World Women's Chess Championship won by Zhu Chen.

2001-2004
Kosteniuk became European women's champion by winning the tournament in Dresden, Germany. As she achieved this with a performance rating above 2600, she was awarded the grandmaster title in November 2004, becoming the tenth woman to receive the highest title of the World Chess Federation (FIDE). Before that, she had also obtained the titles of Woman Grandmaster in 1998 and International Master in 2000.

2005

Kosteniuk won the Russian Women's Championship.

2006-2008

In August, she became the first Chess960 women's world champion after beating Germany's top female player Elisabeth Pähtz by 5½–2½. She defended that title successfully in 2008 by beating Kateryna Lahno  However, her greatest success so far has been to win the Women's World Chess Championship 2008, beating in the final the young Chinese prodigy Hou Yifan with a score of  Later in the same year, she won the women's individual blitz event of the 2008 World Mind Sports Games in Beijing.

2010

In the Women's World Chess Championship 2010 she was eliminated in the third round by the eventual runner-up, Ruan Lufei, and thus lost her title.

2013

In 2013, Kosteniuk became the first woman to win the men’s (i.e. universal) Swiss Chess Championship. She also won the women Swiss champion title.

2014

In 2014, she tied for first place with Kateryna Lagno in the Women's World Rapid Championship, which was held in Khanty-Mansiysk, and took the silver medal on tiebreak, as Lagno won the direct encounter.

2015

In 2015 Kosteniuk won the European–ACP Women's Rapid Championship in Kutaisi. In July of the same year, she lost the Swiss championship playoff to Vadim Milov, and was declared women's Swiss champion.

2016

Kosteniuk again won the Russian Women's Championship.

2017

In 2017 she won the European ACP Women's Blitz Championship in Monte Carlo.

2019
In late May, Alexandra faced Ukrainian-American International Master Anna Zatonskih in the quarterfinal match of the 2019 Women's Speed Chess Championship, an online blitz and bullet competition hosted by Chess.com. Kosteniuk dominated the match and won with an overall score of 20–8. In late November, Kosteniuk won the European Women's rapid and blitz championships in Monaco. In December, she shared first place in the second leg of FIDE Women's Grand Prix 2019–20 in Monaco. In December she also achieved 2nd place in the Belt and Road World Chess Woman Summit, behind Hou Yifan.

2020
In August 2020, Alexandra was part of the Russian team which shared the gold medal with India in the Online Chess Olympiad. She was unhappy with this result and has also tweeted regarding this issue, drawing criticism from many chess followers.

2021 
In July and August 2021, Kosteniuk participated in the inaugural Women's Chess World Cup, a 103-player knockout tournament in Sochi, Russia, held in parallel with the open Chess World Cup. Seeded 14th in the tournament, she won all of her classical matches without ever needing to play a tiebreak, defeating Deysi Cori, Pia Cramling, Mariya Muzychuk, Valentina Gunina and Tan Zhongyi, before winning the tournament with a 1.5 - 0.5 score against top seed Aleksandra Goryachkina in the finals. In addition to $50,000 in prize money, she also gained 43 rating points and a place in the Women's Candidates Tournament 2022.

Kosteniuk ended the year by winning the women's world rapid championship in Warsaw, with an undefeated and unequalled 9.0 out of 11 score.

She also placed second behind IM Bibisara Assaubayeva in the blitz championship.

Other activities
Kosteniuk worked as a model and also acted in the film Bless the Woman by Stanislav Govorukhin.

Kosteniuk is a member of the "Champions for Peace" club, a group of 54 famous elite athletes committed to serving peace in the world through sport, created by Peace and Sport, a Monaco-based international organization.

Together with 43 other Russian elite chess players, Kosteniuk signed an open letter to Russian president Vladimir Putin protesting against the 2022 Russian invasion of Ukraine.

Personal life
Born in Perm, Kosteniuk moved to Moscow in 1985. She has a younger sister named Oksana, who is a Woman FIDE Master-level chess player.

Kosteniuk has dual Swiss-Russian citizenship. She married Swiss-born businessman Diego Garces born in 1959, who is of Colombian descent, at eighteen years old. On 22 April 2007 she gave birth to a daughter, Francesca Maria. Francesca was born 2½ months premature but  made a full recovery after an 8-week stay in the hospital. In 2015, Kosteniuk married Russian Grandmaster Pavel Tregubov.

Notable games

The World vs Alexandra Kosteniuk, 2004, Sicilian Defense: Najdorf Variation. English Attack (B90), 0–1
Alexandra Kosteniuk vs Alexander Onischuk, Corus, Group B 2005, Spanish Game: Classical Variation (C65), 1–0
Anna Ushenina vs Alexandra Kosteniuk, WWCh. 2008, Nimzo-Indian Defense: Classical, Noa Variation (E34), 0–1

Bibliography

 Как стать гроссмейстером в 14 лет. Moscow, 2001. 202, [2] с., [16] л. ил. .
 Как научить шахматам : дошкольный шахматный учебник / Александра Костенюк, Наталия Костенюк. Moscow : Russian Chess House, 2008. 142 с .

Notes

References

External links

Chessqueen Alexandra Kosteniuk's chess blog 

Alexandra Kosteniuk's chess tips – ChessKillerTips
 Interview with Grandmaster Alexandra Kosteniuk on LatestChess site

1984 births
Living people
Women's world chess champions
Chess grandmasters
Female chess grandmasters
Chess woman grandmasters
European Chess Champions
World Youth Chess Champions
Russian chess writers
Sportspeople from Perm, Russia
Russian female chess players
Russian State University of Physical Education, Sport, Youth and Tourism, Department of Chess alumni
Twitch (service) streamers
Russian activists against the 2022 Russian invasion of Ukraine